The Storm Runner is a novel written by J. C. Cervantes and published in September 2018. It is the second of many books in the "Rick Riordan Presents" imprint and is about thirteen-year-old Zane Obispo who uses a cane to get around due to a debilitating limp. The jacket art was designed by Maria Elias and drawn by Irving Rodriguez. A short story by Cervantes about the characters in the book were featured in the anthology book, The Cursed Carnival and Other Calamities.

Synopsis 
Zane Obispo's favorite activity to partake in when he's not at school is exploring the sleeping volcano in his own backyard. One day, while discovering new cracks and creases in the mountain, a small airplane crashes into it, disturbing Zane and his three-legged dog Rosie. Soon after the accident, a mysterious girl named Brooks appears at Zane's doorstep, demanding that she and Zane meet up at the volcano. Zane agrees, trying to impress Brooks, and she explains to him that "myths are real" and the volcano is actually a centuries-old prison for the Mayan god of death, whose destiny is linked to Zane's. Zane's neighbor Ms. Cab, who is a psychic, explains to Zane that his father, who was left when Zane was an infant, is Hurakan, a Mayan deity.

Characters 
 Zane Obispo: a thirteen-year-old with a limp. He uses a cane named Fuego to get around, and is the son of Hurakan, a Mayan deity.
 Brooks: a young nawal who comes to Zane after a small airplane mysteriously crashes.
 Rosie: Zane's loyal three-legged dog. Near the end of book one, she is turned into a hellhound by Ixtab.
 Hondo: a teammate of Zane and Brooks who accompanied them to defeat Ah-Puch.
 Ah-Puch: the god of death, darkness and destruction. He is often referred to in the book as "The Stinking One" and "Ah-Puke."
 Jazz: a giant and associate of Brooks who helps them in their quests.
 Ixtab: the new ruler of Xib'alb'a. She forces Zane to write The Storm Runner about the recent events in his life.
 Hurakan: a Mayan god and Zane's father.
 Ms. Cab: a friend of Zane and Nik'wachinel, Mayan seer, who is Mr. Ortiz's wife.
 Mr. Ortiz: a friend of Zane and pepper farmer who is Ms. Cab's husband.

Reception 
The Laughing Place promotes the book and gives it a high review of "four exciting exploding volcanoes out of four."

Sequels 
Prior to the release of the first novel, a second was announced, to be called The Fire Keeper, detailing the events of Zane's island life and how he attempts to escape the island, surrounding which there is a massive force field created by Ixtab. The Fire Keeper was released on September 3, 2019. A third book, title, The Shadow Crosser, released on September 1, 2020. It is the final installment in the Storm Runner series.

Spin-off 
In December 2020, it was announced that a spin-off series entitled Shadow Bruja duology, written by J. C. Cervantes, would be published under the "Rick Riordan Presents" publishing imprint. It will debut with its first novel on October 4, 2022, followed by the second installment in 2023. Shadow Bruja series will follow Ren, a character introduced in The Fire Keeper.

See also 

 Rick Riordan Presents

References 

2018 American novels
American adventure novels
2018 fantasy novels
Mesoamerican mythology in popular culture
Disability in fiction